The  was the lone surviving tree of the Takata Pine Forest, which suffered deadly damage from the Great East Japan Earthquake tsunami in 2011. It was located in Rikuzentakata, Iwate Prefecture. Preserved as a permanent reminder of the Great East Japan Earthquake, it died shortly after the tsunami due to exposure to saltwater.

Overview 

In the 2011 Tōhoku earthquake and tsunami, the tsunami was over 10 meters in height at Takata Pine Forest in Rikuzentakata, and almost the entire grove was completely swept away, with the exception of one lone pine tree.

This lone survivor caught the public's imagination as a symbol of hope and was widely reported upon by newspapers worldwide. Also, since one tree survived, the official designation as a "Place of Scenic Beauty" was not revoked. The lone surviving pine died in December 2012 due to seawater contamination of the surrounding soil. Disaster recovery work began in December 2013 with the building of a new sea wall and restoration of the beach, which had been buried in meters of silt. Cleanup efforts were hampered by fears that the wood of the fallen pines had been contaminated by radiation effects from the Fukushima Daiichi nuclear disaster. Tree planting events were held in 2017 and 2018, during which time 2500 pine seedlings were planted by volunteers. The area is now part of the Sanriku Fukkō National Park.

See also 
 Takata-matsubara

References

External link

2011 Tōhoku earthquake and tsunami
Individual pine trees
Rikuzentakata, Iwate